Hapalaraea is a genus of beetles belonging to the family Staphylinidae.

The species of this genus are found in Europe and Northern America.

Species:
 Hapalaraea alutacea (Reitter, 1909)
 Hapalaraea hamata (Fauvel, 1878)

References

Staphylinidae
Staphylinidae genera